General Maney may refer to:

George Earl Maney (1826–1901), Confederate States Army brigadier general
Patt Maney (born 1948), U.S. Army brigadier general